Nadeau Township is a civil township of Menominee County in the U.S. state of Michigan. The population was 1,160 at the 2000 census.

Communities 
 Carney is a village within the township. The Carney ZIP code, 49812, serves most of the northern part of the township
Both the community and the township were named after Bruno (Barney) Nadeau, who owned the first farm in the area. The Chicago and North Western Railway built a station in 1878. A post office named "Nadean" was established on May 29, 1878, with Bruno (Barney) Nadeau as the first postmaster. The misspelled name of the post office was not corrected until February 20, 1890. The Nadeau post office, with ZIP code 49863, provides service for an area along US 41 north of Carney.
 The village of Daggett is to the south in Daggett Township, and the Daggett ZIP code, 49821, also serves most of the southern part of Nadeau Township.
 The village of Powers is to the north in Spalding Township, and the Spalding ZIP code, 49874 also serves a small area in the northern part of Nadeau Township.

Geography
According to the United States Census Bureau, the township has a total area of 80.8 square miles (209.3 km), of which 80.7 square miles (209.0 km) is land and 0.1 square mile (0.4 km) (0.17%) is water.

Demographics
As of the census of 2000, there were 1,160 people, 480 households, and 314 families residing in the township.  The population density was 14.4 per square mile (5.6/km).  There were 710 housing units at an average density of 8.8 per square mile (3.4/km).  The racial makeup of the township was 98.28% White, 0.09% African American, 0.60% Native American, 0.17% Asian, 0.09% from other races, and 0.78% from two or more races. Hispanic or Latino of any race were 0.69% of the population.

There were 480 households, out of which 29.4% had children under the age of 18 living with them, 53.1% were married couples living together, 8.1% had a female householder with no husband present, and 34.4% were non-families. 31.5% of all households were made up of individuals, and 15.4% had someone living alone who was 65 years of age or older.  The average household size was 2.41 and the average family size was 3.03.

In the township the population was spread out, with 25.5% under the age of 18, 7.2% from 18 to 24, 26.2% from 25 to 44, 26.2% from 45 to 64, and 14.8% who were 65 years of age or older.  The median age was 40 years. For every 100 females, there were 99.3 males.  For every 100 females age 18 and over, there were 103.8 males.

The median income for a household in the township was $29,375, and the median income for a family was $36,932. Males had a median income of $29,236 versus $22,396 for females. The per capita income for the township was $15,983.  About 8.8% of families and 11.6% of the population were below the poverty line, including 17.0% of those under age 18 and 9.0% of those age 65 or over.

References 

Townships in Menominee County, Michigan
Marinette micropolitan area
Townships in Michigan